Tuulepealne maa ("Windward Land") is a twelve-part Estonian television mini-series about the pre-World War II history of Estonia, its birth as a country, the Estonian War of Independence, post-war life throughout 1920 up to 1941 and World War II.

The series first aired on 9 October 2008 on Estonia's ETV. Each episode runs at approximately 55 minutes. The show was created by Mihkel Ulman and historian Lauri Vahtre, the series is produced by Raivo Suviste. DVD was published in the April 2009. But the last part "Not a War for Young Men" was aired on 24 February 2013.

Plot
The main characters in the series are a Lääne County-native Toomas Roo (Kaljujärv), who is to start his studies in Tallinn, and Indrek Kallaste (Avandi), a son of wealth, who studies at the same school as Toomas. The series plot follows the lives of the two young men.

The show also features historic characters, such as Konstantin Päts and Johan Laidoner.

The Estonian Declaration of Independence was publicly proclaimed in Pärnu on 23 February 1918 and afterwards on 24 February 1918 in Tallinn.

Toomas Roo joins Vaps Movement in 1933. In 1940–1941 he and Indrek Kallaste are members of Forest Brothers squad which participates in the attack on Tallinn on 28 August 1941.

Episodes
 Part one – Independence for a Day
 Part two – From Schooldesk to a Battlefield
 Part three – War Is War
 Part four – Quo Vadis?
 Part five – Affairs of the Heart
 Part six – Of Love and Friendship
 Part seven – Firewater
 Part eight – Veterans of the War of Independence
 Part nine – Silence
 Part ten – What Will Be?
 Part eleven – Sinking Ship
 Part twelve – State of Glass
 Part thirteen – Not a War for Young Men

Cast
Rasmus Kaljujärv as Toomas Roo
Märt Avandi as Indrek Kallaste
Evelin Pang as Adele Kallaste 
Mirtel Pohla as Maret Kallaste 
Marko Matvere as Artur Kallaste 
Andrus Vaarik as Osvald Kallaste 
Tõnu Oja as Joosep Roo
Ago Anderson as Herbert Sammal
Kristjan Sarv as Leo Solba
Tõnu Mikiver as Einar Soodla 
Üllar Saaremäe as Karl Ploompuu
Ülle Lichtfeldt as Maria Kallaste
Liina-Riin Olmaru as Elfriede Kallaste
Anne Reemann as Inge Roo
Marika Vaarik as Asta Sammal 
Indrek Taalmaa as Konstantin Päts 
Eero Spriit as Johan Laidoner 
Marin Mägi-Efert as Marju Pärtel 
Taavi Teplenkov as Sarapiku Jass  
Veljo Reinik as Anton Telg  
Ester Pajusoo as Reet  
Hele Kõrve as Ivi Kallaste  
Priit Loog as Richard Rõõmus
Inga Salurand as Silvia
Egon Nuter as Jakob

References

External links
Official website 
Introduction at postimees.ee 

2008 Estonian television series debuts
2000s Estonian television series
2008 in Estonian television
Eesti Televisioon original programming